These are the international rankings of Mexico.

Other

References

Mexico